Yuri Gurski (born 23 January 1983) is an IT entrepreneur, founder of several startups subsequently acquired by Facebook, Mail.ru Group, Google and Israeli billionaire Teddy Sagi.

Yuri is a Co-founder & CEO at Palta.com (previously known as Haxus), a health & well-being tech company, which best-known products are Flo and Lensa apps.

In 2016, GoalEurope called Gurski "the most successful IT entrepreneur in Eastern Europe.

Life 
Yuri Gurski was born on 23 January 1983 in Minsk, Belarus. 

In 2000, he graduated from secondary school No. 219. In 2008, he completed a master’s degree in journalism from Belarusian State University. In 2010, he obtained an Executive MBA degree from the IPM Business School under the Kozminski University program (Warsaw, Poland).

In 2008, he co-founded Ideanomix book house in partnership with one of the largest CIS publishing houses, EKSMO. Since 2006, he has been working in the IT sector.

He has a twin brother, Dmitry, who is a CEO of Flo.

In 2016, Gurski and his family moved to the city of Limassol, Cyprus. Yuri is a vegetarian.

IT-Business 
In 2009, Gurski co-founded Viaden Mobile, part of Viaden Media. The company’s main focus was the creation of fitness and gaming apps, including All-in Pedometer, Yoga.com, and All-in Fitness. In 2012, Viaden Mobile was acquired by Israeli billionaire Teddy Sagi.

In 2013, Gurski took over as CEO of Sport.com, which specialized in fitness apps. Under his leadership, the company had become an HTP-company and developed several popular mobile applications for sports and fitness. He left the project in 2014.

In 2014, he became a mentor of the Maps.me project. During Yuri's two-year tenure, the project grew into a large mobile offline map for travelers with over 90 million installations across the world. Later the same year it was acquired by the Mail.ru Group corporation to become a part of the My.com brand.

Gurski also joined Mail.ru in November 2014. In 2016, he held the position of Vice President of new product development.  He left Mail.ru Group on 29 July 2016. Representatives of Mail.Ru Group stated the conflict of interest as the reason for dismissal. The issue has been resolved through the parties have come to the understanding that the conflict of interest did not take place.

He was a mentor and investor of the MSQRD project (video and photo selfie app), acquired by Facebook on 9 March 2016.

Gurski co-founded Palta, which in 2015 created the Flo, an AI-powered women’s health platform. In October 2018, Palta received $200 million valuation. As of 2021, It has more than 2.4 million active subscribers and employs over 600 people across its offices in London, Munich, Limassol, Vilnius, and Warsaw. Other company products include Simple, a nutrition and behavioral health tool, and Zing Coach, an AI-backed fitness coach.

In 2017, Google bought the AIMATTER start-up owned by Gurski and Yury Melnichek.This year Yuri participated in the preparation of the decree On the development of the digital economy which was intended to create unprecedented conditions for the development of the IT industry to turn Belarus into an international tech haven. Gurski commented on the prospects of the decree on Belarusian television.

In spring 2018, Gurski cooperated with the management team at Gagarin Capital, which invests in AI-based projects, including photo service Prisma and later Lensa based on it.

In August 2021, Palta announced that it had raised $100 million in a Series B funding round led by Per Brillioth at VNV Global, with the participation of Target Global and other investors.

Publications 
Gurski was the owner of the Ideanomix publishing house, and an author of about 30 popular books on information technology, including a bestseller about Photoshop.

Selected works:
 Y. Gurski, A. Zhvalevski. Video Tutorial. Photoshop CS4
 Y. Gurski, G. Kondratyev. Photojokes with Photoshop
 Y. Gurski. Photoshop CS2: Tips and Tricks
 Y. Gurski, A. Zhvalevski, V. Zavgorodni. CG: Photoshop CS5, CorelDRAW X5, Illustrator CS5
 Y. Gurski. Digital Photography. Tips and Tricks

Awards and recognition 
 Ranked No. 1 in Top Belarusian Business People Under 40 in 2016 and 2017, Probusiness.by magazine
 Ranked No. 3 in Top 50 Personalities in the Belarusian IT World 2016, ITmentor
 Ranked No. 9 in Top Belarusian Business People Under 40 in 2015, Probusiness.by magazine
 “Mentor of the Year 2014", BEL.BIZ / Belarus High-Tech Park
 “Belarus Entrepreneur of the Year 2011"

References  

1983 births
Belarusian State University alumni
Businesspeople from Minsk
Living people